Frida Anna Linnéa Svedin Thunström (born 4 November 1989 in Timrå, Sweden) is a Swedish ice hockey forward.

International career
Svedin Thunström was selected for the Sweden women's national ice hockey team in the 2010 Winter Olympics. She played in all five games, recording one assist.

Svedin Thunström has also appeared for Sweden at the IIHF Women's World Championships. Her only appearance to date came in 2009.

Career statistics

International career

References

External links

1989 births
Ice hockey players at the 2010 Winter Olympics
Living people
Olympic ice hockey players of Sweden
People from Timrå Municipality
Swedish women's ice hockey forwards
Sportspeople from Västernorrland County